Dayus may refer to:
 Dayus (leafhopper), a genus of insects in the family Cicadellidae
 Dayus, a genus of polychaete worms in the family Histriobdellidae; synonym of Steineridrilus
 Dayus, a genus of crustaceans in the family Gynodiastylidae; synonym of Jennidayus

 Kathleen Dayus (1903–2003), an English author